Kei Satō (born 4 July 1979) is a Japanese politician who has served as a member of the House of Councillors since 2016, representing Nara Prefecture.

Career
Satō was born on 4 July 1979 in Nara Prefecture. He graduated from the faculty of economics at the University of Tokyo in 2003, and later also obtained degrees from Carnegie Mellon University and USC Gould School of Law.

After his graduation, Satō joined the Ministry of Internal Affairs and Communications in 2003. In 2011, he moved to the municipal government of Hitachiōta, Ibaraki, becoming director general of the policy planning and later general affairs departments. In 2014, he became executive secretary to the special advisor of the Prime Minister. He was elected as a member of the House of Councillors representing Nara in 2016, winning 292,440 votes. 

On 8 July 2022, former prime minister Shinzo Abe gave a speech in Nara supporting Satō's reelection campaign. During the speech, Abe was shot and killed by an assailant. The election took place two days later, with Satō winning his reelection bid.

References

1979 births
Living people
People from Nara Prefecture
Japanese civil servants
Liberal Democratic Party (Japan) politicians
Members of the House of Councillors (Japan)
21st-century Japanese politicians
Carnegie Mellon University alumni
USC Gould School of Law alumni
University of Tokyo alumni